The following is a list of historic buildings in Quebec City, Quebec. The city's earliest structures originated from First Nations settlements, although the city's oldest standing structures originate from the French colony established in 1608 by Samuel de Champlain.

List of historic buildings
The following is a list of historic buildings still standing in Quebec City.

List of ruins
The following is a list of ruins of historic buildings in Quebec City.

References

 
Quebec City
Historic

fr:Liste des lieux patrimoniaux de Québec